Leonard Development Group was a company that made the SmartWorks integrated suite of Macintosh software. It was based in Jacksonville, Florida. It was acquired by Symantec on June 24, 1991. A new version, renamed GreatWorks, was released in summer 1991.

References

Defunct software companies of the United States
Gen Digital acquisitions